Ernie Lennie (born 20 December 1953) is a Canadian former cross-country skier who competed in the 1976 Winter Olympics.

References

External links
 

1953 births
Living people
Canadian male cross-country skiers
Olympic cross-country skiers of Canada
Cross-country skiers at the 1976 Winter Olympics
First Nations sportspeople